"Healthy Competition" is the second episode of series 3 of the BBC sit-com, Only Fools and Horses. It was first broadcast on 17 November 1983. In the episode, Rodney decides to leave Trotters Independent Traders and go into business with Mickey Pearce, but soon learns that it is harder than it looks.

Synopsis
After an argument with Del Boy for failing to spot an approaching policeman at the market, leading to a frantic chase scene, Rodney informs Del and Grandad that he has other things on his mind and is preparing to make a big announcement, namely that he is leaving Trotters Independent Traders to set up a business partnership with his friend Mickey Pearce. Del and Grandad warn Rodney that Mickey Pearce is untrustworthy and has no business sense, but Rodney dismisses their claims. Del warns Rodney that going it alone means he has to pay for everything himself in future, but Rodney proceeds with it, insisting that he can prove he is just as good as Del. Rodney raises his revenue by informing Del that he owns one half of Trotters to which Del, after slight hesitation, gives Rodney money from the pile (though clearly less than half, in keeping with his character).

Rodney and Mickey meet Del at a local auction the following day, and set their eyes on a set of glass goblets. Del then arrives and urges them not to buy Lot 37, claiming that it is just scrap iron. Both Rodney and Mickey, thinking Del is trying to cheat them out of bidding for that lot, go ahead and purchase Lot 37, which turns out to be rusting and broken lawnmower engines. It also emerges Del was the one selling the engines in the first place, having drunkenly bought them off Alfie Flowers, an associate of his. Adding insult to injury, Rodney and Mickey have paid so wildly over the odds for the engines that Del ends up making a decent profit on the engines, with which he was able to buy the goblets they were after.

Things immediately go downhill for Rodney. Whilst Del has a successful week and manages to sell all his merchandise, Rodney and Mickey are lumbered with the broken lawnmower engines, which are still stuck in Mickey's garden shed. Del tells Grandad about his own success and they both joke about Rodney's misfortune with the lawnmower engines. According to Del, two nights previously, someone broke into the shed and stole two of the engines, only to return them the next night. Rodney returns home and Grandad asks Del to leave him alone and not discuss the engines.

Rodney is clearly struggling but is determined to convince Del he is managing perfectly. He claims to have had plenty of clients asking about the engines, and his claims become more exaggerated as Del probes further into his business. Rodney asks for some food but Del refuses, telling Grandad not to cook him anything as he has not paid his housekeeping money. Rodney attempts to persuade him, but he does not budge. Grandad asks how Rodney could be struggling with money when he had the £200 given to him by Del out of their share of the partnership. It soon transpires that Mickey has gone on holiday to Benidorm with the company finances, leaving Rodney with nothing.

Feeling sorry for his brother, Del comes up with a scheme to get Rodney to rejoin Trotters Independent Traders with his pride intact and thinking that he has been successful. He pays another trader, Towser, to buy the lawnmower engines from Rodney for £200, despite having a scrap value of only £20, and to make up a story about a contact in the GLC Parks Department who wants as many engines as he can get. Towser then asks what he should do with the engines, and Del tells him to give them back to Alfie. With Del's plan, Rodney will gain a bit of confidence and realise he would be better off being Del's partner again, and Del will get his money back when Rodney buys back into Trotters Independent Traders.

The next day, at The Nag's Head, Rodney tells Del he liquidated the partnership with Mickey, and proudly tells him that he has sold the lawnmower engines to Towser. Unfortunately, it becomes apparent that Del's plan has not quite worked out, and that Towser only paid Rodney £165 and kept the remaining £35 for himself. Worse still, Rodney has invested all the proceeds in buying another set of lawnmower engines from Alfie Flowers which are, unknown to Rodney, the same ones Towser had just given back to him. He thus asks Del if he can borrow some money, and Del angrily bemoans what a "42 carat plonker" his brother is. Del gives Rodney an elastic band to put around his Gucci to stop the sole coming off.

Episode cast

First appearances
Patrick Murray as Mickey Pearce

Music
John Williams: Jaws theme

Note: In the VHS/DVD versions, John Williams' "Jaws theme" is replaced by a similar-sounding piece of music.

External links
 

Only Fools and Horses (series 3) episodes
1983 British television episodes